Linnaea chinensis, synonyms Abelia chinensis and Abelia rupestris, commonly known as  Chinese Abelia  (Chinese: , Pinyin: Nuò mǐ tiáo),  is a  semi-evergreen, densely branched  shrub with dark green foliage.  It is a species of flowering plant in the honeysuckle family Caprifoliaceae.

Description

It is a compact deciduous shrub with reddish stems and glossy, small leaves that become reddish-brown before autumn. Its simplified-form flowers are funnel-shaped, white, and its pink sepals remain long after flowering.  As long as the plant continues to make new growth during the summer, it will continue to flower.  It is one of the most cold-resistant species within the genus.

Taxonomy

It was described by Robert Brown in 1818, and transferred to the genus Linnaea in 1872, although this move was not widely accepted until 2013.

Distribution

The plant inhabits South Central China and Southeast China,  as well as Taiwan, Vietnam and the Ryukyu Islands in Japan. 

Linnaea chinensis is commonly cultivated in China and is also used elsewhere. The cultivar 'China Rose'
has gained the Royal Horticultural Society's Award of Garden Merit.

A garden hybrid between L. chinensis and L. uniflora was once thought to be only a variety of L. chinensis and was known, under the synonym Abelia rupestris, as A. rupestris var. grandiflora. It is now Linnaea × grandiflora.

References

Caprifoliaceae
Flora of China
Flora of Japan
Flora of Taiwan
Garden plants
Least concern plants
Plants described in 1818
Taxa named by Robert Brown (botanist, born 1773)
Taxa named by Alexander Braun
Taxa named by Georg Carl Wilhelm Vatke